Suzana Ansar (born 14 February ) is an English singer, actress and television presenter of Bangladeshi descent.

Early life
Ansar was born London, England to Bangladeshi expatriate parents. Her mother, (Jenney) Syeda S Karim, is a community activist and her father, Mohamed Ansar Uddin, is a chartered accountant and businessman. She is the eldest of two children. Her mother was one of the founders of Bengali International. She has a younger brother, Syed Saadi Ansar.

She grew up in Woodford Green, attended Ilford Ursuline High School, and then Forest School, Walthamstow. She then studied BSc Mathematics and Business Finance at Queen Mary and Westfield College, University of London. She is a part qualified Chartered Certified Accountant.

Ansar's grandparents are originally from Mymensingh, Brahmanbaria, and Chandpur, however, they are settled in Dhaka. Her aunt is current Bangladeshi foreign minister Dipu Moni.

Music career

Ansar's parents encouraged her to connect with both her eastern and western cultures thus taking up harmonium, tanpura, sitar and Bengali and Arabic lessons as well as learning to play the piano. Ansar started singing from the age five. Her first music teacher, Gulab Mangal Chaudhary, taught her the harmonium. In 1988, she went to in Bangladesh, and learned from Ustad Zakir Hossain and some other teachers. In 1989, at the age of 11, she started learning classical music from Pandit Haridas Ganguly at Pandit Horidas Ganguly School who started her on tanpura. At the age of 11, she started learning classical music. From the age of 10–11, Ansar trained in Indian classical music from a young age singing in genres ranging from Uchango Sangeet, Khyal, Nazrul Geeti, Hindi to Bengali folk and fusion. From the age of 15 or 16, Ansar started teaching and has her own music school "Suzana Ansar Music School" where she trains young British Bengali children. The school was featured on a Channel S programme called Suzana and Kids.

In 2006, a case study was written about Ansar in the book A Tale of Three Generations. Ansar has collaborated with State of Bengal on the track "Burn Your Toes" from his 1999 album Visual Audio and the track "Sukno Patar" from his 2007 album Skip-IJ. She has also collaborated with Clottaire K. In November 2009, Ansar's solo debut album Suzana Ansar with Khansar was released by Bangladeshi record label G-Series/Agniveena featuring her band which is made up of herself, her brother Syed Shahdin Ansar (Saadi), tabla player Yamin Chowdhury (Shagor), and Imran Khan.

In February 2013, Ansar's second album Mehvashaa, co-recorded with Raja Kaasheff, was released by Movie Box UK and launched at the House of Commons. The album features tracks Ansar sang in Hindi, Urdu, Bengali and Persian.

In March 2011, Ansar was interviewed by Anwarul Hoque on BBC Asian Network.

In December 2013, she performed live on BBC Asian Network's Saima Ajram Show. In March 2014, Islam was interviewed by Nadia Ali on BBC Asian Network.

Ansar's music has represented the works of Bengali poet Kazi Nazrul Islam. She has toured U.S, Spain, France, Italy, Sweden, Germany, Belgium, Greece, Canada, Australia, New Zealand, Thailand, Bangladesh and India. She has performed alongside Bangladeshi singers Ayub Bachchu, Baby Naznin, Runa Laila, Asif Akbar, Momtaz Begum, James Nagar Baul and Habib as well as Indian singer Sonu Nigam.

Television career
Ansar has been on television several times, sometimes working as a presenter. The programs are Poboner Boytha, Valentines Special and Series Rupban on Bangla TV UK; Suzana n Kids and Sur Jolsha on Channel S, Phoney Phone Gaan on NTV UK; Amaro Gaitey Ichhey Holo and Music Jam on NTV; Boishakhi Special on ATN Bangla; Ta NA NA NA and Tommy Miah's Recipe on Ekushey Television.

Acting career
Ansar has appeared in UK television films in Sylheti and Bengali dialects, including Mayar Taney, Friends 1 and 2, and Projonmo.

She has also appeared in Bangladesh television serials, including Fifty Fifty on Banglavision; The Graduate on NTV; Life Partner, Borishaila Mama Bhaigna, Aite Shaal Jaite Shaal and Colours of Cambridge on ATN Bangla; and Dead End- 30 days.

In 2012, she played the role of Suzanne in BBC educational game show BBC Janala Mojay Mojay Shekha for a segment titled "Raisa in Bangladesh".

Personal life
On 1 August 2014, Ansar married Yamin "Shagor" Chowdhury.  His father is the Mukti Juddha, teacher and artiste Mahmudur Rahman Benu ( who starred in Muktir Gaan directed by cousin Tareque Masood

Discography

Albums

See also
British Bangladeshi
List of British Bangladeshis

References

External links

Iqbal, Jamil. Suzana Ansar. Swadhinata Trust. 17 May 2006

1978 births
Living people
English Muslims
English people of Bangladeshi descent
21st-century Bangladeshi musicians
Bengali-language singers
Hindi-language singers
Urdu-language singers
Persian-language singers
English television actresses
English film actresses
English women singers
English actresses of South Asian descent
Singers from London
Actresses from London
People from Leyton
Fusion music genres
21st-century women singers
People from Woodford, London
People educated at Forest School, Walthamstow
Alumni of Queen Mary University of London
21st-century English women singers
21st-century English singers